Ian Millar Bill (born 4 September 1944) is a Scottish retired football left winger who played in the Scottish League for Queen's Park. He was capped by Scotland at amateur level.

References

Scottish footballers
Scottish Football League players
Queen's Park F.C. players
Association football wingers
Scotland amateur international footballers
1944 births
Living people
Footballers from Motherwell
Alumni of the University of Glasgow
Glasgow University F.C. players